A clown is a performer who often reflects the humour and/or frailty of the human condition.

Clown or clowns may also refer to:

People
 Shawn Crahan (born 1969), American musician, aka Clown

Arts, entertainment, and media

Fictional characters
 Clown (comics), the name of two Marvel Comics characters
 Evil clown, a horror or dark humor character
 Clown (Harlequinade), the name of a stock character in the "Harlequinade" entertainment

Films
 Clown (film), a 2014 horror film
 I Clowns (film) (also known as The Clowns), a 1970 television film by Federico Fellini

Music
 "Clown" (Emeli Sandé song), a 2012 single by Emeli Sandé
 "Clown" (Korn song), by nu metal band Korn
 "Clowns" (song),  by British duo Goldfrapp
 Clowns (band), an Australian hardcore punk band.

Other uses in arts, entertainment, and media
 Clowns (video game)
 Der Clown, a German television series

Biology
 Clownfish, a fish from the subfamily Amphiprioninae
 Clown loach, a tropical freshwater fish

Other uses
 HMS Clown, the name ship of the Clown-class gunboats of the Royal Navy
 Indianapolis Clowns, a professional baseball team

See also 
 Clowne, Derbyshire, England
 Klovn, a Danish television sitcom
 Klovn The Movie, a 2010 Danish comedy film, a spinoff of the sitcom
 Pagliacci
 Tears of a Clown (disambiguation)
 The Clown (disambiguation)